Clémence de Grandval (21 January 1828 – 15 January 1907), born as Marie Félicie Clémence de Reiset and also known as Vicomtesse de Grandval and Marie Grandval, was a French composer of the Romantic era. She was a person and composer of stature during her life, although less remembered subsequently. Many of her works were published under pseudonyms.

Biography
Marie Félicie Clémence de Reiset was the youngest of four children, born in 1828 into a well-to-do family in the Chateau de la Cour du Bois at Saint-Rémy-des-Monts. Her father was an Officier de la Légion d'honneur and a talented pianist, while her mother wrote and published stories. Her parents received many composers and artists, including Jean-Baptiste-Philémon de Cuvillon, Auguste-Joseph Franchomme, Louis-Nicolas Cary and Paul Scudo.

At a very young age, she received composition lessons from composer and family friend Friedrich Flotow, and later studied with Frédéric Chopin. Because her family was wealthy, she was able to work as a composer without financial concerns. She married the Vicomte de Grandval and they had two daughters, Isabelle and Thérèse. She subsequently studied for two years with Camille Saint-Saëns (he dedicated his Oratorio de Noel to her), and continued to work as a composer after her marriage. However, her social position led her to publish several of her works under pseudonyms. These included Caroline Blangy, Clémence Valgrand, Maria Felicita de Reiset and Maria Reiset de Tesier.

Grandval was the recipient of the inaugural Prix Rossini, winning in 1881 with her librettist Paul Collin. Her earliest works were sacred and performed in churches, but she went on to write a number of operas and various popular songs and instrumental works, including many pieces for oboe. Unfortunately, the orchestral scores of some of her pieces have been lost.

During the 1870s, Grandval played a major role in the Société Nationale de Musique, and was the most played composer in this society. She also gave much money to the organisation. During the second part of the 19th century, she was a very popular composer who was admired by many critics. She died in Paris in 1907.

Notable compositions

Unlike many of her contemporaries, Grandval wrote many pieces for oboe, and unlike her female contemporaries, she wrote several operas. Selected works include:

Opera
 Le sou de Lise (1859)
 Les fiancés de Rosa (1863)
 Piccolino (1869)
 Atala (c. 1888)
 Mazeppa (1892)

Choral
 Mass (1867)
 Stabat mater (1870), cantata
 Sainte-Agnès (1876), oratorio
 La fille de Jaïre (1881), oratorio

Concertante
 Oboe concerto in D minor, Op. 7

Chamber
 2 pieces for clarinet and piano (1885)
 4 pieces for cor anglais and piano
Deux Pieces, ob, vc, pf, 1884; published by June Emerson: WP references: https://www.juneemersonwindmusic.com/DEUX-PIECES-Romance-Gavotte.html

Songs
 "Noël!" (1901)

Awards
 1880: Concour Rossini, for her oratorio La fille de Jaïre.
 1890: Cartier Prize, Conservatoire de Paris, for her chamber music.

References

External links
 
 Biography of Clémence de Grandval 
Women of note: http://womenofnote.co.uk/

1828 births
1907 deaths
19th-century classical composers
20th-century classical composers
People from Sarthe
French opera composers
French vicomtesses
French Romantic composers
French women classical composers
19th-century French composers
Women opera composers
20th-century French women musicians
20th-century French composers
20th-century women composers
19th-century women composers